Sud Carangas is a province in the central parts of the Bolivian department of Oruro.

Location
Sud Carangas province is one of the sixteen provinces in the Oruro Department. It is located between 18° 38' and 19° 09' South and between 66° 37' and 67° 34' West.

The province borders Saucarí Province in the North, Carangas Province in the Northwest, Litoral Province in the West, Ladislao Cabrera Province in the South, Sebastián Pagador Province in the Southeast, Eduardo Avaroa Province in the East, and Poopó Province in the Northeast. The province borders Poopó Lake in the East.

The province extends over 60 km from North to South, and 100 km from East to West.

Population
Main idiom of the province is Aymara, spoken by 96.5%, while 78.1% of the population speak Spanish and 46.0% Quechua (1992).

The population increased from 4,028 inhabitants (1992 census) to 6,136 (2001 census), an increase of 52%. - 41.1% of the population are younger than 15 years old (1992).

99.9% of the population have no access to electricity, 98.7% have no sanitary facilities (1992).

77.9% of the population are employed in agriculture, 4.1% in industry, 18.0% in general services (2001).

74.8% of the population are Catholics, 18.9% are Protestants (1992).

Division
The province comprises two municipalities which are further subdivided into cantons.

External links
General map of province
Detailed map of province towns and rivers
Population data (Spanish)

Provinces of Oruro Department